Sei Dam (also known as the Sei Diversion Dam) is an earthen gravity dam on the Sei River, a tributary of Sabarmati River, in Kotra tehsil in Udaipur district of Rajasthan, India. The primary purpose of the dam is to store water to be diverted to the Jawai Dam on the Jawai River in Pali district.

The catchment area of the Sei River at the dam site is 320 square kilometres. Construction of the Sei Dam was started in 1977 and completed in 1978 at the cost of Rs. 4.07 crores.

References

Dams in Rajasthan
Dams in Sabarmati River basin
Dams completed in 1978
1978 establishments in Rajasthan
20th-century architecture in India